Fallen Firefighters Memorial may refer to:
 Fallen Firefighters Memorial (Wu), a sculpture group by Hai Ying Wu in Seattle, Washington
 Los Angeles Fallen Firefighters Memorial, in Los Angeles, California
 National Fallen Firefighters Memorial, in Emmitsburg, Maryland
 New York State Fallen Firefighters Memorial, in Albany, New York